Thinus Delport (born 2 February 1975, in Port Elizabeth) is a South African ex rugby union player who played at wing or fullback for Worcester Warriors and South Africa.

He started his career playing for the Lions from U21 level and he made his senior debut in 1997.  Playing in the Super 12 for the Lions formerly known as The Cats.

Delport began his English career at Gloucester. Whilst there he started the 2003 Powergen Cup Final in which Gloucester defeated Northampton Saints. Delport joined Worcester from Gloucester in 2004. Delport left Worcester Warriors in 2007 and became a television rugby presenter
He made his international debut on the Springboks' 1997 European tour.  However, it was three years before he made his test debut against Canada in East London (2000).

Delport also played in the Tsunami Memorial game representing the southern hemisphere alongside some of the world’s greatest players.

It was announced in March 2008 that Delport would be moving to Japanese Side Kobelco Steelers at the end of the season, to pursue a new rugby career there.

On 24 June 2010 it was announced Delport had signed a 1-year deal at National 1 outfit Stourbridge as a player coach.

After retirement he has also played an amateur game for the Old Patesian veterans, a local Gloucestershire club, in which they beat their rivals: Smiths Industries, in the third team's cup.

In 2014 Delport became an ambassador for Project Zulu, a UK based charity running the educational development projects in the Madadeni township, KZN, South Africa. In February 2015 he visited the Madadeni township to host their first schools tag rugby tournament.

Delport is also an ambassador and active member of Rugby for Heroes, a UK based charity helping active and retired service men and women make the transition to civilian life, using Rugby as a medium. He works alongside patrons Mike Tindall OBE and Nick Knowles to build up the profile of the charity.

References

External links
 South Africa Profile at SARugby.co.za
 Worcester Warriors Profile at Warriors.co.uk
 Guinness Premiership Profile at GuinnessPremiership.com
 
 

South African rugby union players
South Africa international rugby union players
Gloucester Rugby players
Worcester Warriors players
Barbarian F.C. players
Lions (United Rugby Championship) players
Golden Lions players
Sharks (rugby union) players
Sharks (Currie Cup) players
Kobelco Kobe Steelers players
Expatriate rugby union players in Japan
1975 births
Living people
Afrikaner people
South African expatriate rugby union players
Expatriate rugby union players in England
South African expatriate sportspeople in Japan
South African expatriate sportspeople in England
Rugby union players from Port Elizabeth
Rugby union wings
Rugby union fullbacks